The Doncaster Mile, registered as the Doncaster Handicap is an Australian Turf Club Group One Thoroughbred handicap race for horses three years old and older, held over 1,600 metres at Royal Randwick Racecourse, Sydney, Australia. Although the race has traditionally been held on Easter Monday, the race is now run on the first day of the ATC Championships Carnival at Royal Randwick.  Total prize money is A$3,000,000.

History 
The inaugural running of the Doncaster Handicap in 1866. The 1892 running of the race attracted a record 30 starters.
In 1930 the race was marred by a tragic fall  furlongs from the winning post when one of the favourites fell and another was destroyed.

Many great horses have won the race, including several who have also won the spring equivalent, the Epsom Handicap, while Super Impose created history in 1990 and 1991 by becoming the only horse to win both races on two occasions.

Legendary trainer T.J. Smith won the race seven times.

The record time for the race was set by Belmura Lad in 1979 with a time of 1:33.70. Beaten in 2018 by fan favourite Happy Clapper in 1.33.17.

In 2005 trainer Guy Walter trained the trifecta in this race with Patezza (1st), Courts In Session (2nd) and Danni Martine (3rd). It was the first time that this has been achieved.

Distance
From 1879 to 1884 the distance of the race was 9 furlongs.
The race name was changed in 2010 to the Doncaster Mile, although the race is not exactly 1 mile. That was the distance of the race before 1973 when the metric system was introduced in Australia.

1933 racebook

Winners

 2022 - Mr Brightside
 2021 - Cascadian
 2020 - Nettoyer
 2019 - Brutal
 2018 - Happy Clapper
 2017 - It's Somewhat
 2016 - Winx
 2015 - Kermadec
 2014 - Sacred Falls
 2013 - Sacred Falls
 2012 - More Joyous
 2011 - Sacred Choice
 2010 - Rangirangdoo
 2009 - Vision and Power
 2008 - Triple Honour
 2007 - Haradasun
 2006 - Racing To Win
 2005 - Patezza
 2004 - Private Steer
 2003 - Grand Armee
 2002 - Sunline
 2001 - Assertive Lad
 2000 - Over
 1999 - Sunline
 1998 - Catalan Opening
 1997 - Secret Savings
 1996 - Sprint By
 1995 - Pharaoh
 1994 - Pharaoh
 1993 - Skating
 1992 - Soho Square
 1991 - Super Impose
 1990 - Super Impose
 1989 - Merimbula Bay
 1988 - Lygon Arms
 1987 - Magic Flute
 1986 - Hula Chief
 1985 - Row Of Waves
 1984 - Vite Cheval
 1983 - Emancipation
 1982 - My Gold Hope
 1981 - Lawman
 1980 - Iko
 1979 - Belmura Lad
 1978 - Maybe Mahal
 1977 - Just Ideal
 1976 - Authentic Heir
 1975 - Dalrello
 1974 - Tontonan
 1973 - Analie
 1972 - Gunsynd
 1971 - Rajah Sahib
 1970 - Broker's Tip
 1969 - Bye Bye
 1968 - Unpainted
 1967 - Tobin Bronze
 1966 - Citius
 1965 - Time And Tide
 1964 - Persian Puzzle
 1963 - Fine And Dandy
 1962 - Te Poi
 1961 - Fine And Dandy
 1960 - Tudor Hill
 1959 - Tudor Hill
 1958 - Grenoble
 1957 - Slogan II
 1956 - Slogan II
 1955 - Fire Dust
 1954 - Karendi
 1953 - Triclinium
 1952 - Prelate
 1951 - Oversight
 1950 - Grey Boots
 1949 - Bernbrook
 1948 - The Diver
 1947 - Blue Legend
 1946 - Blue Legend
 1945 - Abbeville
 1944 - Goose Boy
 1943 - Kingsdale
 1942 - Tuhitarata
 1941 - Mildura
 1940 - Mildura
 1939 - Gold Rod
 1938 - Hamurah
 1937 - Sarcherie
 1936 - Cuddle
 1935 - Hall Mark 
 1934 - Chatham
 1933 - Winooka
 1932 - Jacko
 1931 - Sir Chrystopher
 1930 - Venetian Lady
 1929 - Karuma
 1928 - Simeon's Fort
 1927 - Don Moon
 1926 - Valicare
 1925 - Fujisan
 1924 - Whittier
 1923 - The Epicure
 1922 - Julia Grey
 1921 - Speciality
 1920 - Sydney Damsel
 1919 - Hem
 1918 - Dame Acre
 1917 - Wedding Day
 1916 - Eurobin
 1915 - Garlin
 1914 - First Principle
 1913 - Jolly Beggar
 1912 - Lochano
 1911 - Broadsword
 1910 - Storey
 1909 - Hyman
 1908 - Togo
 1907 - Istria
 1906 - Little Toy
 1905 - Famous
 1904 - Chere Amie
 1903 - Rose Petal
 1902 - Sir Foote
 1901 - Wakeful
 1900 - Parapet
 1899 - Vigorous
 1898 - Syerla
 1897 - Superb
 1896 - Courallie
 1895 - Delaware
 1894 - Donizetti
 1893 - Cremorne
 1892 - Marvel
 1891 - Paris
 1890 - Sir William
 1889 - Russley
 1888 - Ben Bolt
 1887 - Abner
 1886 - Crossfire
 1885 - St. Lawrence
 1884 - Rataplan
 1883 - Sardonyx
 1882 - Stella
 1881 - Rapid Bay
 1880 - Queensland
 1879 - The Hook
 1878 - Laertes
 1877 - Speculation
 1876 - Briseis
 1875 - Priam
 1874 - Myrtle
 1873 - Wanderer
 1872 - Vixen
 1871 - Sir William / Lottery 
 1870 - Barbelle 
 1869 - Tippler
 1868 - Casino
 1867 - Sir Solomon
 1866 - Dundee

Notes:
  Date of race rescheduled due to postponement of the Easter Saturday meeting because of the heavy track conditions. The meeting was moved to Easter Monday, 6 April 2015.
  Dead heat
  Falcon finished first but was disqualified.

See also
 List of Australian Group races
 Group races

References

External links 
 The Doncaster Mile first three

Open mile category horse races
Group 1 stakes races in Australia
Breeders' Cup Challenge series
Randwick Racecourse
Sports competitions in Sydney